Edward Peters may refer to:

 Edward N. Peters (born 1957), American canon lawyer
 Edward C. Peters (1855–1937), Atlanta real estate developer
 Edward Peters (scholar), professor specializing in the religious and political history of early Europe
Edward Peters (Atlanta), see Atlanta Street Railway
Ed Peters, candidate for the Iowa's 7th congressional district

See also
Ned Peters, character in The Case of the Cautious Condor
Ted Peters (disambiguation)
 Peter Edwards (disambiguation)